An Jong-su (born 1951) is a North Korean politician. He is a Vice Chairman of the Workers' Party of Korea (WPK) and the director of the Light Industry Department of the WPK.

An is said to have close ties with Pak Pong-ju and Kim Kyong-hui.

See also

 Politics of North Korea

References

Living people
Date of birth missing (living people)
Place of birth missing (living people)
1951 births
Vice Chairmen of the Workers' Party of Korea and its predecessors